The Târnava Mare ("Great Târnava";) is a river in Romania. Its source is in the Eastern Carpathian Mountains, near the sources of the Mureș and Olt in Harghita County. It flows through the Romanian counties of Harghita, Mureș, Sibiu, and Alba. The cities of Odorheiu Secuiesc, Sighișoara, and Mediaș lie on the Târnava Mare. It joins the Târnava Mică in Blaj, forming the Târnava.

Towns and villages

The following towns and villages are situated along the river Târnava Mare, from source to mouth: Subcetate, Zetea, Brădești, Odorheiu Secuiesc, Feliceni, Mugeni, Porumbeni, Cristuru Secuiesc, Secuieni, Sighișoara, Daneș, Dumbrăveni, Dârlos, Mediaș, Copșa Mică, Micăsasa, Valea Lungă, Blaj.

Tributaries

The following rivers are tributaries to the river Târnava Mare (from source to mouth):

Left: Chiuveș, Vărșag, Șicasău, Pârâul Băutor, Deșag, Brădești, Gorom, Hodoș, Mugeni, Pârâul Caprelor, Scroafa, Pârâul Cărbunarilor, Daia, Șapartoc, Valea Dracului, Vâlcăndorf, Șaeș, Criș, Laslea, Valchid, Biertan, Ațel, Valea Mare, Buzd, Moșna, Ighiș, Vorumloc, Vișa, Șeica, Soroștin, Cenade, Spătac, Veza

Right: Tartod, Creanga Mică, Pârâul Rece, Senced, Busniac, Pârâul Sărat, Cireșeni, Beta, Tăietura, Fâneața Îngustă, Feernic, Goagiu, Eliseni, Rogoz, Valea Morii, Prod, Fântâna Veteului, Giacăș, Șmig, Curciu, Păucea, Chesler, Valea Lungă

Târnava Mare SCI
The dry grassland habitat beside the river is now part of a (SCI) Site of Community Importance.

References

 
Rivers of Romania
Rivers of Harghita County
Rivers of Mureș County
Rivers of Sibiu County
Rivers of Alba County